Augustine Bockarie is a Sierra Leonean politician from the opposition Sierra Leone People's Party (SLPP), who is currently a member of parliament representing Kono District.

External links
SLPP MPs

Year of birth missing (living people)
Living people
Members of the Parliament of Sierra Leone
Sierra Leone People's Party politicians
Place of birth missing (living people)
21st-century Sierra Leonean politicians